Willy Simons (9 November 1917 – 4 December 2009) was a Belgian water polo player. He competed in the men's tournament at the 1948 Summer Olympics.

References

External links
 

1917 births
2009 deaths
Belgian male water polo players
Olympic water polo players of Belgium
Water polo players at the 1948 Summer Olympics
People from Borgerhout